James Joseph Nicholson (born 27 February 1943 in Belfast) is a Northern Irish former footballer who played as a midfielder. He played most of his career at Huddersfield Town and earned more than 40 caps for the Northern Ireland national team.

Club career
Nicholson began his career with Manchester United, for whom he made 58 appearances, scoring five times, between 1960 and 1963, when he moved over the Pennines to Huddersfield Town. He subsequently played for Bury, Mossley and Stalybridge Celtic.

International career
Nicholson represented Northern Ireland at international level. He represented his country at each level earning three caps for the Schoolboys, as well as playing twice for Northern Ireland U23 and four caps for Northern Ireland B.

He also appeared for Northern Ireland at full international level, appearing 41 times for Northern Ireland, scoring 6 goals. Over an 11-year international career from 1960-71 making him the most capped player internationally for Huddersfield Town.

Honours

Club
Huddersfield Town
Football League Second Division (1): 1969-70

External links
 Jimmy Nicholson's Legends feature on thisisthebarmyarmy.co.uk 
 Jimmy Nicholson's career stats

1943 births
Association footballers from Belfast
Living people
Association footballers from Northern Ireland
Northern Ireland international footballers
Association football midfielders
English Football League players
Manchester United F.C. players
Huddersfield Town A.F.C. players
Bury F.C. players
Mossley A.F.C. players
Stalybridge Celtic F.C. players